Automated retail is the category of self-service, standalone kiosks that operate as fully automatic retail stores through the use of software integrations to replace the traditional retail services inside in a traditional retail store. These standalone kiosks are often located in heavily trafficked locations such as airports, malls, resorts and transit hubs.

Consumers often browse and select products using a touchscreen interface that operates similar to an ecommerce website, pay for purchases using a credit or debit card, and then the product is dispensed through a system other than gravity fed drop systems, often via a robotic arm inside the kiosk.

These software integrations, the consumer experience and the delivery mechanisms are what differentiate automated retail stores from vending machines.

ZoomShops and Redbox are examples of companies that pursue an automated retail business model.

See also

Automat
Automated restaurant
Automated teller machine (ATM)
Business process automation
Cashierless store
Self checkout
Types of retail outlets
Vending machine

Notes

Retail processes and techniques